Fayetteville Historic District is a national historic district located at Fayetteville, Fayette County, West Virginia.  The district encompasses 126 contributing buildings, 4 contributing sites, and 3 contributing structures.   It includes the central business district and surrounding residential areas of Fayetteville.  Notable buildings include Jack's Garage (1934), Theatre Building (1935), Fayette County Jail (1907), McClung House (1850), Old Methodist Church (c. 1905), Old Post Office (1920), Bank of Fayette-Town Hall (1921), U.S. Post Office (1938), and the War Memorial Building (1949).  Also in the district is the site of Fort Toland, site of Fort Scammon and the Old Fayetteville Cemetery.  The district includes the separately listed Fayette County Courthouse, E. B. Hawkins House, and Altamont Hotel.

It was listed on the National Register of Historic Places in 1990.

References

Commercial buildings on the National Register of Historic Places in West Virginia
Historic districts in Fayette County, West Virginia
Greek Revival architecture in West Virginia
Gothic Revival architecture in West Virginia
Colonial Revival architecture in West Virginia
Fayetteville, West Virginia
National Register of Historic Places in Fayette County, West Virginia
Historic districts on the National Register of Historic Places in West Virginia